Hidden Aces is a 1927 American silent action film directed by Howard M. Mitchell and starring Charles Hutchison, Alice Calhoun and Barbara Tennant.

When an exiled White Russian Princess arrived in the United States several different people plot to relieve her of her valuable jewels.

Cast
 Charles Hutchison as Larry Hutchdale
 Alice Calhoun as Natalie Knowles
 Barbara Tennant as Princess Orloff
 Paul Weigel as Serge Demidoff
 Harry Norcross as Burke
 James Bradbury Jr. as Butler
 Frank Whitson as Captain

References

Bibliography
 Munden, Kenneth White. The American Film Institute Catalog of Motion Pictures Produced in the United States, Part 1. University of California Press, 1997.

External links
 

1927 films
1920s action films
American silent feature films
American action films
American black-and-white films
Pathé Exchange films
Films directed by Howard M. Mitchell
1920s English-language films
1920s American films